Wild liquorice or wild licorice typically refers to any of three plants:

Liquorice milk-vetch, a European species Astragalus glycyphyllos
Small spikenard, a North American species Aralia nudicaulis
American licorice, a North American species Glycyrrhiza lepidota
Abrus precatorius, Asian species

but may also refer to other members of the liquorice genus Glycyrrhiza.